Abapeba echinus is a species of spider belonging to the family Corinnidae.

It is native to Brazil.

References

Corinnidae
Spiders described in 1896
Spiders of Brazil